Éva Lindner (24 February 1926 – 19 August 2016) was a Hungarian former figure skater. She competed in the ladies' singles event at the 1948 Winter Olympics.

References

1926 births
2016 deaths
Hungarian female single skaters
Olympic figure skaters of Hungary
Figure skaters at the 1948 Winter Olympics
Figure skaters from Budapest